Henry Hill Jr. (June 11, 1943 – June 12, 2012) was an American mobster who was associated with the Lucchese crime family of New York City from 1955 until 1980, when he was arrested on narcotics charges and became an FBI informant. Hill testified against his former Mafia associates, resulting in 50 convictions, including those of caporegime (captain) Paul Vario and fellow associate James Burke on multiple charges. He subsequently entered the Witness Protection Program, but was removed from the program in 1987.

Hill's life story was documented in the true crime book Wiseguy: Life in a Mafia Family by Nicholas Pileggi, which was subsequently adapted by Martin Scorsese into the critically acclaimed 1990 film Goodfellas, in which Hill was portrayed by Ray Liotta.

Early life
Henry Hill Jr. was born on June 11, 1943, in the Manhattan borough of New York City to Henry Hill Sr., an Irish-American electrician and the son of a coal miner, and Carmela Costa, an Italian immigrant of Sicilian descent. Hill claimed in the book Wiseguy that his father emigrated to the United States from Ireland at the age of twelve, after the death of Hill's grandfather. The working-class family, consisting of Henry and his seven other siblings, grew up in Brownsville, a working-class neighborhood of Brooklyn. Hill was dyslexic and as a result performed poorly at school.

From an early age, Hill admired the local mobsters who socialized at a dispatch cabstand across the street from his home, including Paul Vario, a caporegime in the Lucchese crime family. In 1955, when he was 11 years old, Hill wandered into the cabstand looking for a part-time after-school job. In his early teens, Hill began running errands for patrons of Vario's storefront shoeshine, pizzeria, and cabstand. He first met the notorious hijacker and Lucchese family associate James "Jimmy the Gent" Burke in 1956. The 13-year-old Hill served drinks and sandwiches at a card game and was dazzled by Burke's openhanded tipping: "He was sawbucking me to death. Twenty here. Twenty there. He wasn't like anyone else I had ever met."

The following year, Vario's younger brother, Vito "Tuddy" Vario, and Vario's son, Lenny Vario, presented Hill with a highly sought-after union card in the bricklayers' local. Hill would be a "no show" and put on a building contractor's construction payroll, guaranteeing him a weekly salary of $190. This didn't mean Hill would be getting or keeping all that money every week, however; he received a portion of it, and the rest was kept and divided among the Varios. The card also allowed Hill to facilitate the pickup of daily policy bets and loan payments to Vario from local construction sites. Once Hill had this "legitimate" job, he dropped out of high school and began working exclusively for the Vario gangsters.

Hill's first encounter with arson occurred when a rival cabstand opened just around the corner from Vario's business. The competing company's owner was from Alabama, new to New York City. Sometime after midnight, Tuddy and Hill drove to the rival cabstand with a drum full of gasoline in the back seat of Tuddy's car. Hill smashed the cab windows and filled them with gasoline-soaked newspapers, then tossed in lit matchbooks.

Hill was first arrested when he was 16; his arrest record is one of the few official documents which used his real name. Hill and Lenny, Vario's equally underage son, attempted to use a stolen credit card to buy snow tires for Tuddy's wife's car. When Hill and Lenny returned to Tuddy's, two police detectives apprehended Hill. During a rough interrogation, Hill gave his name and nothing else; Vario's attorney later facilitated his release on bail. While a suspended sentence resulted, Hill's refusal to talk earned him the respect of both Vario and Burke. Burke, in particular, saw great potential in Hill. Like Burke, he was of Irish ancestry and therefore ineligible to become a "made man". The Vario crew, however, were happy to have associates of any ethnicity, so long as they made money and refused to cooperate with the authorities.

In June 1960, at around 17 years old, Hill joined the United States Army, serving with the 82nd Airborne Division at Fort Bragg in North Carolina. He claimed the timing was deliberate; the FBI's investigation into the 1957 Apalachin mob summit meeting had prompted a Senate investigation into organized crime, and its links with businesses and unions. This resulted in the publication of a list of nearly 5,000 names of members and associates of the five major crime families. Hill searched through a partial list but could not find Vario listed among the Lucchese family.

Throughout his three-year enlistment, Hill maintained his mob contacts. He also continued to hustle: in charge of kitchen detail, he sold surplus food, loan sharked pay advances to fellow soldiers, and sold tax-free cigarettes. Before his discharge, Hill spent two months in the stockade for stealing a local sheriff's car and brawling in a bar with Marines and a civilian. In 1963, he returned to New York and began the most notorious phase of his criminal career: arson, intimidation, running an organized stolen car ring, and hijacking trucks.

In 1965, Hill met his future wife, Karen Friedman, through Vario, who insisted that Hill accompany his son on a double date at Frank "Frankie the Wop" Manzo's restaurant, Villa Capra. According to Friedman, the date was disastrous, and Hill stood her up at the next dinner date. Afterward, the two began going on dates at the Copacabana and other nightclubs, where Friedman was introduced to Hill's outwardly impressive lifestyle. The two later got married in a large North Carolina wedding, attended by most of Hill's gangster friends. In 1994, Hill, in his book Gangsters and Goodfellas, stated that Tommy DeSimone tried to rape Karen.

Air France robbery 

Shortly before midnight on April 6, 1967, Hill and DeSimone drove to the Air France cargo terminal at John F. Kennedy International Airport with an empty suitcase, the largest Hill could find. Inside connection Robert McMahon said that the two should just walk in, as people often came to the terminal to pick up lost baggage. DeSimone and Hill entered the unsecured area unchallenged and unlocked the door with a duplicate key. Using a small flashlight, they loaded seven bags into the suitcase and left with $420,000. No alarm was raised, no shots fired, and no one was injured. The theft was not discovered until the following Monday, when a Wells Fargo truck arrived to pick up the cash to be delivered to the French American Banking Corporation.

Hill believed that it was the Air France robbery that endeared him to the Mafia.

Restaurant ownership and murder of William "Billy Batts" Bentvena 
Hill used his share of the robbery proceeds to purchase a restaurant on Queens Boulevard, The Suite, initially aiming to run it as a legitimate business and provide distance between himself and his mob associates. However, within several months, the nightclub had become another mob hangout. Hill later said that members of Lucchese and Gambino crews moved into the club en masse, including high-ranking Gambino family members who "were always there".

According to the book Wiseguy, after William "Billy Batts" Bentvena was released from prison in 1970, a welcome home party was thrown for him at Robert's Lounge, which was owned by Burke. Hill stated that Bentvena saw DeSimone and jokingly asked him if he still shined shoes, which DeSimone perceived as an insult. DeSimone leaned over to Hill and Burke and said, "I'm gonna kill that fuck". Two weeks later, on June 11, 1970, Bentvena was at The Suite near closing time when he was pistol-whipped by DeSimone. Hill said that before DeSimone started to beat Bentvena, DeSimone yelled, "Shine these fucking shoes!".

After Bentvena was beaten and presumed killed, DeSimone, Burke, and Hill placed his body in the trunk of Hill's car for transport. They stopped at DeSimone's mother's house to fetch a shovel and lime. They started to hear sounds from the trunk, and when they realized that Bentvena was still alive, DeSimone and Burke stopped the car and beat him to death with the shovel and a tire iron. Burke had a friend who owned a dog kennel in Upstate New York, and Bentvena was buried there.

About three months after Bentvena's murder, Burke's friend sold the dog kennel to housing developers, and Burke ordered Hill and DeSimone to exhume Bentvena's corpse and dispose of it elsewhere. In Wiseguy, Hill said the body was eventually crushed in a car crusher at a New Jersey junkyard, which was owned by Clyde Brooks. However, on the commentary for the film Goodfellas, he states that Bentvena's body was buried in the basement of Robert's Lounge, a bar and restaurant owned by Burke, and only later was put into the car crusher.

Drug business
In November 1972, Burke and Hill were arrested for beating Gaspar Ciaccio in Tampa, Florida. Ciaccio allegedly owed a large gambling debt to their friend, union boss Casey Rosado. They were convicted of extortion and sentenced to ten years at the United States Penitentiary, Lewisburg. Hill was imprisoned with Vario, who was serving a sentence for tax evasion, and several members of John Gotti's Gambino crew. In Lewisburg, Hill met a man from Pittsburgh who, for a fee, taught Hill how to smuggle drugs into the prison.

On July 12, 1978, Hill was paroled after four years and resumed his criminal career. He began trafficking in drugs, which Burke eventually became involved with, even though the Lucchese crime family, with whom they were associated, did not authorize any of its members to deal drugs. This Lucchese ban was enacted because the prison sentences imposed on anyone convicted of drug trafficking were so lengthy that the accused would often become informants in exchange for a lesser sentence.

Hill began wholesaling marijuana, cocaine, heroin, and quaaludes based on connections he made in prison; he earned enormous amounts of money. A young kid who was a mule of Hill's "ratted" him out to Narcotics Detectives Daniel Mann and William Broder. "The Youngster" (so named by the detectives) informed them that Hill was connected to the Lucchese family and was a close friend to Vario and to Burke and "had probably been in on the Lufthansa robbery." Knowing of Hill's exploits, the detectives put surveillance on him. They found out that Hill's old prison friend from Pittsburgh ran a dog-grooming salon as a front. Mann and Broder had "thousands" of wiretaps of Hill, but Hill and his crew used coded language in the conversations. Hill's wiretap on March 29 is an example of the bizarre vocabulary:

Lufthansa heist

On December 11, 1978, an estimated $5.875 million (equivalent to $ million in ) was stolen from the Lufthansa cargo terminal at Kennedy airport, with $5 million in cash and $875,000 in jewelry, making it the largest cash robbery committed on American soil at the time. The plot had begun when bookmaker Martin Krugman told Hill that Lufthansa flew in currency to its cargo terminal at the airport; Burke set the plan in motion. Hill did not directly take part in the heist.

Basketball fixing
Hill and two Pittsburgh gamblers set up the 1978–79 Boston College basketball point-shaving scheme by convincing Boston College center Rick Kuhn to participate. Kuhn, who was a high school friend of one of the gamblers, encouraged teammates to participate in the scheme.

Hill also claimed to have an NBA referee in his pocket who worked games at Madison Square Garden during the 1970s. The referee had incurred gambling debts on horse races.

1980 arrest
In 1980, Hill was arrested on a narcotics-trafficking charge. He became convinced that his former associates planned to have him killed: Vario, for dealing drugs; and Burke, to prevent Hill from implicating him in the Lufthansa heist. Hill heard on a wiretap that his associates Angelo Sepe and Anthony Stabile were anxious to have him killed, and that they were telling Burke that Hill "is no good" and "is a junkie". Burke told them "not to worry about it". Hill was more convinced by a surveillance tape played to him by federal investigators, in which Burke tells Vario of their need to have Hill "whacked".

When Hill was finally released on bail, Burke told him they should meet at a bar, which Hill had never heard of or seen before, owned by "Charlie the Jap." However, Hill never met Burke there; instead they met at Burke's sweatshop with Karen and asked for the address in Florida where Hill was to kill Bobby Germaine's son with Anthony Stabile. Hill knew he would be murdered if he went to Florida.

Edward A. McDonald, the head of the Brooklyn Organized Crime Strike Force, arrested Hill as a material witness in the Lufthansa robbery. With a long sentence hanging over him, Hill agreed to become an informant and signed an agreement with the Strike Force on May 27, 1980.

Informant and the witness-protection-program
Hill testified against his former associates to avoid impending prosecution and being murdered by his crew. His testimony led to 50 convictions. Hill, his wife Karen, and their two children (Gregg and Gina) entered the U.S. Marshals' Witness Protection Program in 1980, changed their names, and moved around to several undisclosed locations including Seattle, Washington; Cincinnati, Ohio; Omaha, Nebraska; Butte, Montana; and Independence, Kentucky.

Jimmy Burke was given 12 years in prison for the 1978–79 Boston College point-shaving scandal, involving fixing Boston College basketball games. Burke was also later sentenced to life in prison for the murder of scam artist Richard Eaton. Burke died of cancer while serving his life sentence, on April 13, 1996, at the age of 64.

Paul Vario received four years for helping Henry Hill obtain a no-show job to get him paroled from prison. Vario was also later sentenced to 10 years in prison for the extortion of air freight companies at JFK Airport. He died of respiratory failure on November 22, 1988, at age 73 while incarcerated in the FCI Federal Prison in Fort Worth.

Hill's bigamy, subsequent arrests, and divorce
In the fall of 1981, Hill (now Martin Lewis) met a woman named Sherry Anders. After a whirlwind romance, the two got married in Virginia City, Nevada, despite Hill's already being married. This led to a breakdown in many areas of Hill's life. In 1987, Hill was convicted of cocaine trafficking in a federal court in Seattle and expelled from the witness protection program. In 1990, his wife Karen filed for divorce after 23 years of marriage. The divorce was finalized in 2002.

In August 2004, Hill was arrested in North Platte, Nebraska, at North Platte Regional Airport after he had left his luggage containing drug paraphernalia. On September 26, 2005, he was sentenced to 180 days imprisonment for attempted methamphetamine possession.

Hill was sentenced to two years of probation on March 26, 2009, after he pleaded guilty to two misdemeanor counts of public intoxication. On December 14, 2009, he was arrested in Fairview Heights, Illinois, for disorderly conduct and resisting arrest, which Hill attributed to his drinking problems.

Later years
In his later years, after his first divorce, he married Kelly Alor, and then Lisa Caserta. They lived in Topanga Canyon, near Malibu, California. Both appeared in several documentaries and made public appearances on various media programs including The Howard Stern Show. Hill fathered a third child during this time.

Goodfellas film
Goodfellas, the 1990 Martin Scorsese-directed crime film adaptation of the 1985 non-fiction book Wiseguy by Nicholas Pileggi, follows the 1955 to 1980 rise and fall of Hill and his Lucchese crime family associates. Hill was portrayed by Ray Liotta. Scorsese initially named the film Wise Guy but subsequently, with Pileggi's agreement, changed the name to Goodfellas to avoid confusion with the unrelated television crime drama Wiseguy. Two weeks in advance of the filming, Hill was paid $480,000. Robert De Niro, who portrayed Jimmy Burke, often called Hill several times a day to ask how Burke walked, held his cigarette, and so on. Driving to and from the set, Liotta listened to FBI audio cassette tapes of Hill, so he could practice speaking like his real-life counterpart. The cast did not meet Hill until a few weeks before the film's premiere. Liotta met him in an undisclosed city; Hill had seen the film and told the actor that he loved it.

Other media appearances and activity
The 1990 film My Blue Heaven was based on Hill's life, with the screenplay written by Pileggi's wife Nora Ephron.

The 2001 TV film The Big Heist was based on the Lufthansa heist, and Hill was portrayed by Nick Sandow.

In 2004, Hill was interviewed by Charlie Rose for 60 Minutes. July 24, 2010, marked the 20th anniversary of the release of Goodfellas. This milestone was celebrated with a private screening hosted by Hill for a select group of invitees at the Museum of the American Gangster. On June 8, 2011, a show about Hill's life aired on the National Geographic Channel's Locked Up Abroad.

In 2006, Hill and Ray Liotta appeared in a photo shoot for Entertainment Weekly. At Liotta's urging, Hill entered alcohol rehabilitation two days after the session shoot.

In reference to his many victims, Hill stated in an interview in March 2008 with the BBC's Heather Alexander: "I don't give a heck what those people think; I'm doing the right thing now," addressing the reporter's question about how his victims might think of his commercialization of his story through self-written books and advising on Goodfellas.

In 2008, Hill was featured in episode three of the crime documentary series The Irish Mob. In the episode, Hill recounts his life of crime, as well as his close relationship with Jimmy Burke and the illegal activity the two engaged in together. A large portion of the segment focuses on Burke's and Hill's involvements in the famous Lufthansa heist.

In August 2011, Hill appeared in the special "Mob Week" on AMC; he and other former mob members talked about The Godfather, Goodfellas, and other such mob films.

In 2014, the ESPN-produced 30 for 30 series debuted Playing for the Mob, the story about how Hill and his Pittsburgh associates, and several Boston College basketball players, committed the point-shaving scandal during the 1978–79 season, an episode briefly mentioned in the movie. The documentary, narrated by Liotta, was set up so that the viewer needed to watch the film beforehand to understand many of the references in the story.

Hill was a frequent guest on The Howard Stern Show, where he would often appear in drunken condition and openly discuss his alcoholism.

Books
In October 2002, Hill published The Wiseguy Cookbook: My Favorite Recipes From My Life As a Goodfella To Cooking On the Run. In it, Hill shared some stories throughout his childhood, life in the mob, and running from the law. He also presents recipes he learned from his family, during his years in the mob, and some that he came up with himself. For example, Hill claimed his last meal the day he was busted for drugs consisted of rolled veal cutlets, sauce with pork butt, veal shanks, ziti, and green beans with olive oil and garlic.

In 2012, Henry Hill collaborated with the author, Daniel Simone, in writing and developing a non-fiction book titled, The Lufthansa Heist, a portrayal of the famous 1978 Lufthansa Airline robbery at Kennedy Airport. The book was published in August 2015.

Other books by Hill include:

Restaurants
Hill worked for a time as a chef at an Italian restaurant in North Platte, Nebraska, and his spaghetti sauce, Sunday Gravy, was marketed over the internet. Hill opened another restaurant, Wiseguys, in West Haven, Connecticut, in October 2007, which closed the following month after a fire.

Death
Hill died of complications related to heart disease in a Los Angeles hospital, on June 12, 2012, after a long battle with his illness, a day after his 69th birthday. His girlfriend for the last six years of his life, Lisa Caserta, said, "He had been sick for a long time. ... his heart gave out". 

CBS News aired Caserta's report of Hill's death, during which she stated: "He went out pretty peacefully, for a goodfella." She said Hill had recently had a heart attack before his death and died of complications after a long history of heart problems associated with smoking. Hill's family was present when he died. Hill was cremated the day after his death.

References

Further reading

 

1943 births
2012 deaths
20th-century American criminals
21st-century American criminals
American drug traffickers
American gangsters
American gangsters of Irish descent
American gangsters of Sicilian descent
American Mafia cooperating witnesses
American restaurateurs
American robbers
Criminals from Brooklyn
Criminals from Manhattan
Federal Bureau of Investigation informants
Gangsters from New York City
Lucchese crime family
Lufthansa heist
Military personnel from New York City
People from Brownsville, Brooklyn
People from Topanga, California
People who entered the United States Federal Witness Protection Program
People with dyslexia
United States Army soldiers
Vario Crew